Evergreen Park may refer to:

Evergreen Park, Illinois, a town located in Illinois, United States
Evergreen Park (Haikou), a park in Hainan Province, China